

This is a list of the National Register of Historic Places listings in Greenville, South Carolina.

This is intended to be a complete list of the properties and districts on the National Register of Historic Places in Greenville, South Carolina, United States. The locations of National Register properties and districts for which the latitude and longitude coordinates are included below, may be seen in a map.

There are 88 properties and districts listed on the National Register in Greenville County. The city of Greenville is the location of 45 of these properties and districts; they are listed here, while the properties and districts in the remaining parts of the county are listed separately. Another 4 properties in Greenville were once listed but have been removed.

Current listings

|}

Former listings

|}

See also

List of National Historic Landmarks in South Carolina
National Register of Historic Places listings in South Carolina

References

 
Greenville
Greenfille, South Carolina